Three vessels of the Royal Navy have borne the name HMS Thorn:

  was a 14-gun sloop launched in 1779 that two American frigates,  and  captured on 25 August 1779.  She became an American privateer with a number of successful engagements and prizes to her name.  captured her on 20 August 1782. She then returned to service in the Royal Navy, serving until 1816 when she was sold.
  was a destroyer launched in 1900 and broken up in 1919.
  was a submarine launched in 1941 and sunk in the Mediterranean in 1942.

Citations and references
Citations

References
 

Royal Navy ship names